Admestina archboldi is a species of jumping spider found in the southern United States. The species was first described in 1992 by William Piel.

References

External links

archboldi
Spiders of the United States
Spiders described in 1992